Clara Vestris Webster (1821 – 17 December 1844) was a British dancer.

She was born in Bath in 1821, and studied with her father Benjamin Webster, who had studied with Auguste Vestris, thus her middle name. She made her debut at the Theatre Royal, Bath in 1830.

She died in London on 17 December 1844 after her dress caught fire during The Revolt of the Harem at the Theatre Royal, Drury Lane.

She is buried at Kensal Green Cemetery.

References

1821 births
1844 deaths
Accidental deaths in London
British female dancers
Burials at Kensal Green Cemetery
Deaths from fire